Gunnila Grubb (13 January 1692, Stockholm – 20 August 1729, Stockholm) was a Swedish writer. She wrote spiritual songs inspired by Pietism and Mysticism.

Gunnila Grubb was the daughter of the Stockholm merchant Mikael Vilhelmsson Grubb and Katarina Sohm, and was married in 1716 to the merchant Nils Grubb. She was the mother of Michael Grubb, ennobled as af Grubbens, and Catharina Elisabet Grubb.

Grubb was a member of the circles of radical members of Pietism and the Moravian Church. She is referred to as an example of the strong role females could play within these movements.

Works
 Nr 15, 18, 24, 28, 35, 36, 52, 68, 74. 75, 76, 77, 86. 88, 199 in Andeliga Wijsor... (1739)
 Nr 29, 61 in Sions Sånger, Stockholm (1743)

References

 Ann Öhrberg (2001). Vittra fruntimmer. Författarroll och retorik hos frihetstidens kvinnliga författare. Stockholm: Gidlunds Förlag. 
 Nordisk kvinnoliteraturhistoria. Första delen (1993)
 Grubb, släkt, urn:sbl:13237, Svenskt biografiskt lexikon, hämtad 2015-09-02.
 Familjenbostrom.se

Further reading

1692 births
1729 deaths
Swedish-language writers
Swedish songwriters
18th-century Swedish writers
18th-century Swedish women writers
Swedish people of the Moravian Church